Neocapsus is a genus of plant bugs in the family Miridae. There are about six described species in Neocapsus.

Species
These six species belong to the genus Neocapsus:
 Neocapsus agrarius (Distant, 1884)
 Neocapsus cuneatus Distant, 1893
 Neocapsus fasciativentris (Stål, 1862)
 Neocapsus leviscutatus Knight, 1925
 Neocapsus mexicanus Distant, 1893
 Neocapsus zopilotes Carvalho, 1987

References

Further reading

External links

Miridae genera
Articles created by Qbugbot
Mirini